Manambuchavadi was an old suburb of Thanjavur town which formed the European quarter of the city in colonial times. It is also the birthplace of Manambuchavadi Venkatasubbayyar, a famous Carnatic musician.

References

Thanjavur